Joe's Domage is an album featuring a portion of the rehearsal tape for the album Waka/Jawaka (1972) by Frank Zappa, posthumously released in October 2004. It is the second in a series of releases put together by archivist Joe Travers which started with Joe's Corsage (2004).

Track listing
All tracks written by Frank Zappa.

Personnel
 Frank Zappa – guitar, vocals
 Tony Duran – guitar, vocals
 Ian Underwood – organ
 Sal Marquez – trumpet
 Malcolm McNab – trumpet
 Ken Shroyer – trombone
 Tony Ortega – baritone saxophone
 Alex Dmochowski (a.k.a. Erroneous) – bass guitar, vocals
 Aynsley Dunbar – drums

References

External links
 Lyrics and detailed information
 Joe's Domage at zappa.com

Compilation albums published posthumously
Frank Zappa compilation albums
2004 compilation albums